Ranjeet Kumar Dass (born 1 December 1965) is an Indian politician And journalist  from Assam serving as the Minister of Panchahyat and Rural Development, Food and Civil supplies, and Consumer Affairs,Government of Assam in the Himanta Biswa Sarma ministry since 2021.He is a member of the Assam Legislative Assembly from the Bharatiya Janata Party representing Patacharkuchi since 2021 and Sorbhog from 2011 to 2021.  He was elected as Speaker of the Assam Legislative Assembly from 2016 to 2017.He became a member of the BJP in 1992. From 2011 to 2016, he was the deputy leader of the BJP in the Assam Legislative Assembly. . 
He served as BJP Assam state unit  President from 2016 to 2021.

References 

1965 births
Living people
Bharatiya Janata Party politicians from Assam
Speakers of the Assam Legislative Assembly
People from Barpeta
Gauhati University alumni
Assam MLAs 2016–2021
Assam MLAs 2006–2011
People from Barpeta district
State Presidents of Bharatiya Janata Party
Assam MLAs 2021–2026